Norton railway station can apply to the following railway stations in England:

Norton railway station (Cheshire), a former station in Norton, Cheshire, England
Norton railway station (South Yorkshire), a former station in Norton, South Yorkshire, England
Norton railway station (Worcestershire),  a former Birmingham and Gloucester Railway station, closed in 1846
Norton Halt railway station, a former Oxford, Worcester and Wolverhampton Railway station in Norton, Worcestershire, England
Worcestershire Parkway railway station, a current station in Norton, Worcestershire, England